Patricia Louise Meller Grambsch is an American biostatistician known for her work on survival models including proportional hazards models. She is an associate professor emerita of biostatistics at the University of Minnesota.

Education and career
Grambsch completed her Ph.D. in 1980 at the University of Minnesota, with the dissertation Conditional Likelihood Inference supervised by David Hinkley. Before returning to Minnesota as a faculty member, she worked in the survival analysis group at the Mayo Clinic for five years, from 1985 to 1990.

Book
With Terry M. Therneau, Grambsch is the author of the book Modeling Survival Data: Extending the Cox Model (Statistics for Biology and Health, Springer, 2000).

Recognition
Grambsch was elected as a Fellow of the American Statistical Association in 1996.

References

American statisticians
Women statisticians
Biostatisticians
University of Minnesota alumni
University of Minnesota faculty
Year of birth missing (living people)
Living people